

The I.Ae. 25 Mañque (en: Vulture) was an Argentine assault troop/cargo glider designed at the Instituto Aerotecnico de Cordoba. The prototype was finished on 11 August 1945, flying only once before it was cancelled. Its structure was constructed with Argentine woods mañio, araucaria and guatambú.

Its design was based on the American military glider CG-4A Waco, its exterior configuration being very similar. It had a crew of two and carried 13 fully loaded soldiers.

Specifications

See also

 Altinger Lenticular 15S
 I.Ae. 34 Clen Antú
 I.Ae. 41 Urubú

References
 Article on the 50th anniversary of the "Fabrica Militar de Aviones" listing all the aircraft developed and manufactured there since 1927, Aerospacio, Buenos Aires, 1977. (in Spanish)
 Article online on the 75th anniversary of the "Fabrica Militar de Aviones", Aerospacio, Buenos Aires, 2002. (in Spanish)

External links

 Development and Specifications (in Spanish)

1940s Argentine sailplanes
1940s Argentine military transport aircraft
1940s military gliders
FMA aircraft
World War II military equipment of Argentina
Glider aircraft
Aircraft first flown in 1945